George Rajendran Kuttinadar (born 14 April 1968) is the bishop of the Thuckalay diocese of the Syro-Malabar Catholic Church, appointed to that position by Pope Benedict XVI on 24 August 2012. He was educated in Nashik where he studied philosophy and in Shillong where he studied theology. He was formerly principal of St. Anthony’s Higher Secondary School in Shillong. He was ordained as a priest on 29 December 2003 and as a bishop on 16 September 2012.

References

1968 births
Living people
Syro-Malabar bishops
People from Kanyakumari district